The 2008 term of the Supreme Court of the United States began October 6, 2008, and concluded October 4, 2009. The table illustrates which opinion was filed by each justice in each case and which justices joined each opinion.

Table key

2008 term opinions

2008 term membership and statistics
This was the fourth term of Chief Justice Roberts' tenure and the third and last full term with the same membership, as Justice Souter retired after the term finished.

Notes

References

 

Lists of United States Supreme Court opinions by term
Lists of 2008 term United States Supreme Court opinions